The 1927 Oklahoma City Goldbugs football team was an American football team that represented Oklahoma City University during the 1927 college football season as a member of the Oklahoma Intercollegiate Conference (OIC). The Goldbugs had an opportunity to secure the conference title in the final game of the season, but played a scoreless tie against Oklahoma Baptist on December 3.

Fullback Bill Moore was the team captain. Moore and center Ray Allen both received first-team honors on the Daily Oklahoman's All-Oklahoma first team.  Quarterback Perk Whitman and end Jack Alexander were named to the second team. Freshman halfback Ace Gutowsky went on to play eight seasons in the National Football League and set the league's career rushing record.

Grady Skillern was an assistant coach in charge of the backfield. Waldorf, who also served as Oklahoma City's athletic director and track coach, left the school after the 1927 season to accept an assistant coaching position at the University of Kansas. He went on to coach at several other schools and was inducted into the College Football Hall of Fame in 1966.

Schedule

Roster
 Jack Alexander, end
 Roy Allen, center, 145 pounds
 Bill Doenges, guard/quarterback and president of the junior class, 165 pounds
 Os Doenges, tackle and president of the senior class, 170 pounds
 Eaton, end, 167 pounds
 Ace Gutowsky, halfback, 169 pounds
 Hal Hilpirt, guard, 167 pounds
 Bill Moore, fullback and captain, 170 pounds
 Perry, end, 168 pounds
 Sadler, tackle/guard, 180 pounds
 Watson, tackle, 189 pounds
 Chuck Wheatley, halfback, 156 pounds
 "Perk" Whitman, quarterback, 136 pounds
The team's players had an average weight of 165 pounds. Senior Catherine Schumaker, president of the school's pep council, was voted by the members of the team as the "Football Queen" for 1927.

Gallery of players

References

Oklahoma City
Oklahoma City Chiefs football seasons
Oklahoma City Goldbugs football